Raymond Joseph Oberbroekling (December 31, 1898 - March 16, 1972) was an American football player in the National Football League. He played with the Kenosha Maroons during the 1924 NFL season.

References

People from Dubuque County, Iowa
Kenosha Maroons players
Loras Duhawks football players
1898 births
1972 deaths